The Binder Rocks are an isolated rock outcrop located  south of the Siglin Rocks on the west side of Martin Peninsula, Bakutis Coast, Marie Byrd Land. The feature was first photographed from the air by U.S. Navy Operation Highjump in January 1947, and was named by the Advisory Committee on Antarctic Names for Lieutenant R.A. Binder, a U.S. Navy maintenance coordinator at the Williams Field air strip, McMurdo Sound, during Operation Deep Freeze 1967.

References 

Rock formations of Marie Byrd Land